The Novelty Iron Works was an ironworking firm founded to make boilers in New York City. Located at 12th street, New York. The founder was the Rev. Eliphalet Nott President of Union College of Schenectady, New York. Eliphalet Nott had invented a boiler and established the works to commercialize his invention. Among the first boilers was used to provide steam for his pleasure boat named the Novelty. This was used to demonstrate the boiler and so the community referred to it as the Novelty Iron Works. It was however registered as the firm of H. Knott & Company. The works was reorganized first as the firm of Ward Stillman & Co. then Stillman, Allen & Co. from 1842 until 1855 with the recruitment of Horatio Allen. In 1855 it was incorporated under its common name and continued operating until 1870. Although they were not the largest principals the family of Eliphalet Nott long continued involvement in the ironworks as ownership changed through different firms.

References

Boilermakers
Defunct marine engineering companies of New York City
Defunct manufacturing companies based in New York City
Ironworks and steel mills in the United States